Zachary Ogada Onyango  (born 11 December 1988) is a retired Kenyan goalkeeper who is currently the goalkeeper trainer with Kenyan Premier League side Nairobi City Stars

Career

Club

He turned out for Kenyan Premier League sides Sony Sugar, Sofapaka F.C., KCB, Gor Mahia F.C. as well as Ethiopian Premier League side Ethiopian Coffee S.C.

Onyango won the Kenyan Premier League title twice with Sony Sugar in 2005/6 and with Sofapaka in the 2009 Kenyan Premier League season and the Ethiopian Premier League title and the Ethiopian Super Cup  with Ethiopian Coffee S.C. in 2011. 

While at Ethiopian Coffee S.C. he featured in the first round of the 2012 CAF Champions League in two games against eventual champions Al-Ahly SC

International
He was capped once for the Kenya national football team during an international friendly away to South Africa in Rustenburg on 9 February 2011.

Honours

Club
Sony Sugar
Kenyan Premier League
 Champions (1): 2005-6
Sofapaka
Kenyan Premier League
 Champions (1): 2009
Ethiopia Coffee
Ethiopian Premier League
 Champions (1): 2011
Ethiopian Super Cup
 Champions (1): 2011
Nairobi City Stars
Kenyan National Super League
 Champions (1): 2019-20

References

External links
 
 

1988 births
Living people
Kenyan footballers
Association football goalkeepers
Kenyan Premier League players
Kenya international footballers
Kenyan expatriate footballers
Kenyan football managers